South Africa competed at the 1960 Winter Olympics in Squaw Valley, United States.  It was the first time that the nation competed at the Winter Olympic Games, and the last time until 1994.

Figure skating

Women

Pairs

References
VIII Olympic Winter Games Squaw Valley, California 1960 Final Report
 Olympic Winter Games 1960, full results by sports-reference.com

Nations at the 1960 Winter Olympics
1960
1960 in South African sport